William Hood may refer to:

 William Hood (art historian), American art historian
 William Hood (footballer) (1914–?), former Northern Irish footballer
 William Hood (politician) (1844–1920), Australian politician
 William Hood (cricketer) (1848-1921), English cricketer
 William W. Hood III (born 1963), Colorado Supreme Court justice
William Hood (MP), son of Thomas Hood (MP)
 Sir William Acland Hood, 6th Baronet (1901–1990) of the Hood baronets
 Billy Hood (1873-?), English footballer

See also
Hood (surname)